may refer to:

 Japanese warship Teibō No. 1, a warship of the Imperial Japanese Navy, former Chōshū Domain Navy.
 Japanese warship Teibō No. 2, a warship of the Imperial Japanese Navy, former Chōshū Domain Navy.

Imperial Japanese Navy ship names
Japanese Navy ship names